NN Running Team is a professional running team based in the Netherlands. It was founded in 2017 by Jos Hermens, the director of Global Sports Communication. The team's title sponsor is the Dutch insurance company NN Group. The running team includes some of the most accomplished distance runners in the world, including many Olympians. One of NN Running Team's training camps is located in Kaptagat, Kenya.

As of January 2023, the team consisted of over 70 athletes from eight different countries, including 50 men and 20 women. Some of its most notable members are: marathon world record holder Eliud Kipchoge, Geoffrey Kamworor, Kenenisa Bekele, Joshua Cheptegei and multiple world record holder Letesenbet Gidey. Since its inception, members of the team achieved (as of March 2022):
 203 road race wins,
 16 world records,
 4 European records,
 29 national records,
 10 World Cup and Olympic Games medals,
 13 World Marathon Majors victories,
 14 silver/bronze medals in World Marathon Majors,
 32 podium finishes in major (but not World Major) city marathons (Amsterdam, Valencia, Rotterdam, Paris, Hamburg).

Members
As of 2022 NN Running Team members included:
Men
 
 
 
 
 
 
 
 
 
 
 
 
 
 
 
 
 
 
 
 
 

Women
  (2022–)

Training camps
NN Running operates training camps in the following locations.

Kaptagat, 
Iten, 
Kapkitony, 
Keringet, 
Kapchorwa, 
Addis Ababa, 
Sendafa, 
Asmara, 
Johannesburg,

Sponsorship
The running team's title sponsor is NN Group.
Other corporate sponsors include Nike, Ineos, and Abbott Laboratories.

References

External links 
NN Running Team official website

Athletics clubs in the Netherlands
ING Group